Güzelköy is a village in Mut district of Mersin Province, Turkey. The population of the village was 226 as of 2012. The village economy depends on agriculture.

References

Villages in Mut District